"The Living Kind" is a song by Australian pop group Ups and Down. The song was released in August 1986 as the lead single from their debut studio album Sleepless. The song peaked at number 75 on the Australian singles chart.

At the ARIA Music Awards of 1987 the song earned the band a nomination for ARIA Award for Best New Talent.

Track listing
7" (884915-7) 
Side A "The Living Kind"
Side B "Painted Sad"

Charts

References 

1986 songs
1986 singles